Lloyd Clarke is a Jamaican ska musician. He had a series of hits in the early 1960s. "Japanese Girl" was featured on Theme Time Radio Hour (season 2).

Singles
"Fool's Day"
"You're a Cheat" 
"Love You the Most" 
"Japanese Girl" (1963)
"Girl Rush" 
"ParapintoBoogie"

References

20th-century Jamaican male singers